The Milwaukee Jaycee Open was a golf tournament on the LPGA Tour from 1962 to 1967. It was played at two different courses in the Milwaukee, Wisconsin area: Tuckaway Country Club Franklin in 1962 and 1966 and North Shore Country Club, then located in Bayside, Wisconsin in 1963–1965, and 1967. Both courses would later host the Greater Milwaukee Open on the PGA Tour.

Winners
Milwaukee Jaycee Open
1967 Susie Maxwell
1966 Kathy Whitworth

Milwaukee Open
1965 Marlene Hagge

Milwaukee Jaycee Open
1964 Mickey Wright
1963 Kathy Whitworth

Milwaukee Open
1962 Mickey Wright

References

Former LPGA Tour events
Golf in Wisconsin
Recurring sporting events established in 1962
Recurring sporting events disestablished in 1967
1962 establishments in Wisconsin
1967 disestablishments in Wisconsin
History of women in Wisconsin